KNMB (96.7 FM, "Mix 96.7") is a radio station broadcasting a hot adult contemporary music format. Licensed to Capitan, New Mexico, United States, the station is currently owned by Mtd, Inc.

References

External links

Hot adult contemporary radio stations in the United States
NMB